Nelson Fabián Benítez (born 24 May 1984) is an Argentine football left-back who plays for Torneo Federal A side Ferro Carril Oeste.

Career

Club
Benítez made his breakthrough into Lanús' first team in 2002. Between 2004 and 2006, he spent time with Talleres and Gimnasia de Jujuy before returning to Lanús. In 2007, Benítez was part of the Lanús squad that won the first top flight championship in the club's history. In May 2008, Benítez agreed a four-year contract to play for Porto in the Primeira Liga. On 17 August 2009, Porto loaned the Argentine left-back to Leixões for a season.
However, in October 2009, Benitez signed for Argentine club San Lorenzo, as replacement for the injured left-backs Aureliano Torres and Sebastián Luna.

In 2016, after spells with Estudiantes, Talleres (in 2013 & 2014) and Olimpia, Serrano joined Atletico Rafaela to play in the Argentine Primera División.

Career statistics

Club
.

Honours

Club
Lanús
Argentine Primera División (1): 2007 Apertura

Porto
Primeira Liga: 2008–09
Taça de Portugal: 2008–09

References

External links
 Guardian statistics
 Argentine Primera statistics at Fútbol XXI  

1984 births
Living people
Sportspeople from Córdoba Province, Argentina
Argentine footballers
Association football defenders
Club Atlético Lanús footballers
Talleres de Córdoba footballers
Gimnasia y Esgrima de Jujuy footballers
San Lorenzo de Almagro footballers
Estudiantes de La Plata footballers
Atlético de Rafaela footballers
FC Porto players
Leixões S.C. players
Club Olimpia footballers
Club Atlético Mitre footballers
Ferro Carril Oeste footballers
Argentine expatriate footballers
Argentine Primera División players
Primera Nacional players
Torneo Federal A players
Primeira Liga players
Paraguayan Primera División players
Expatriate footballers in Portugal
Expatriate footballers in Paraguay
Argentine expatriate sportspeople in Portugal
Argentine expatriate sportspeople in Paraguay